Berrys is an unincorporated community on the Shenandoah River in Clarke County, Virginia. Berrys was originally known as Berry's Ferry for the ferry operated there. Today, Harry Flood Byrd Bridge spans the Shenandoah at Berrys carrying U.S. Route 50 and U.S. Route 17.

Unincorporated communities in Clarke County, Virginia
Unincorporated communities in Virginia